Lorpiprazole (INN) (brand name Normarex) is a marketed anxiolytic drug of the phenylpiperazine group. It has been described as a serotonin antagonist and reuptake inhibitor (SARI) in the same group as trazodone, nefazodone, and etoperidone.

See also 
 Acaprazine
 Enpiprazole
 Mepiprazole
 Tolpiprazole

References 

Antidepressants
Anxiolytics
meta-Trifluoromethylphenylpiperazines
Pyrroles
Serotonin receptor antagonists
Triazoles
Cyclopentanes